Problepsis diazoma is a moth of the  family Geometridae. It is found in Korea and Japan.

The wingspan is 32–41 mm.

References

Moths described in 1938
Scopulini
Moths of Japan
Moths of Korea